Eaglevale Partners was a Manhattan-based, traditional, multi-strategy investment fund focused on currencies, commodities, and bonds. It was founded in 2011 by three former Goldman Sachs colleagues. In 2014, Eaglevale Partners opened a small Greek-focused fund, Eaglevale Hellenic Opportunity, during a tumultuous time in the Greek economy. In May 2016, The New York Times reported that Eaglevale was closing the Hellenic fund after it lost 90% of its value. The firm was managing $330 million at the time, and new investors were expected to invest a minimum of $2 million.

Eaglevale Partners closed in December 2016.

References

Hedge fund firms in New York City
2011 establishments in New York City
2016 disestablishments in New York (state)
Financial services companies established in 2011
Financial services companies disestablished in 2016